Belgium competed at the 2012 Winter Youth Olympics in Innsbruck, Austria. The Belgian team consisted of 7 athletes and 9 officials. Philippe Preat a former Belgian triathlete served as the Chef De Mission of the team. Belgium concluded the Games with one silver medal, won by Dries Van Den Broecke.

Medalists

Alpine skiing

Belgium qualified one boy in alpine skiing.

Boy

Figure skating

Belgium qualified one boy and one girl figure skater.

Ice hockey

Belgium qualified one girl to compete in the skills challenge competition.

Girl

Snowboarding

Belgium qualified two male athletes in snowboarding.

Speed skating

Belgium qualified one female athlete.

Girl

See also
Belgium at the 2012 Summer Olympics

References

External links
Belgium athletes' schedules

Winter Youth
Nations at the 2012 Winter Youth Olympics
Belgium at the Youth Olympics